Handy is an unincorporated community in Hickory Grove Township, Benton County, in the U.S. state of Indiana.

History
Handy was named for a local businessman.

Geography

References

External links

Unincorporated communities in Benton County, Indiana
Unincorporated communities in Indiana